The Chile national baseball team is the national baseball team of Chile. The team represents Chile in international competitions. It is affiliated to the International Baseball Federation and his continental confederation COPABE. It is controlled by the Federación de Béisbol y Softbol de Chile.

History

The history of baseball in Chile started on July 4, 1918.  At the time of the nitrate peak in northern Chile, and product development in the city of Iquique and industrial progress, several ships that dock in this port city with people who came to seek better pay, and one of them (the ship of the line Maru) brought a Japanese man, Sakurada Tatsukichi Endo, who called himself  "John", He wanted to play baseball, which had been the best in the United States, Europe and his native . With 8 players in the city, he founded in 1931 in Iquique Baseball Association and Chile, the first regulatory body of the sport in the country.

The first rudimentary practices wore diamonds in the city and charms made by Sakurada implementation that were not the best 2. However, the competition was almost nil, but soon begins to sport practice in other northern cities, where a competent and clubs, as Tocopilla, Antofagasta, Chuquicamata and of course in Iquique. In Santiago, the first clubs were founded, when Japanese, along with other stakeholders such as Chileans and Nicaraguans and Venezuelans, who in 1949, in the north, would play the first match between cities in Chile in baseball history. In 1951 he founded the Baseball Federation of Chile and in 1953 established a national championship to be held annually adult, which has won Tocopilla nearly 50 percent of the party held to date.

In Iquique from about 14 existing clubs or so, there would be a ninth national champion baseball, then it would again in 1956 in Antofagasta, in 1960 while in Maria Elena, and in Iquique in 1960.  Northern Chileans had good fitness levels.  However, when the competitiveness of the team descended clubs started to disappear.

The 1980s proved to be the best decade in baseball (as well as other sports) in Chile, mostly because of deception that took the football's national team in Spain 1982, reaching the Baseball World Youth Cup conducted in Japan in 1989. However, the victory of Colo-Colo in the Copa Libertadores 1991 led to a resurgence of football in the country; at the same time, baseball, basketball and boxing started to have a serious decline, which worsened during the called Tennis Fever. During the years 1998 and 2004, a period in which baseball was about to disappear from the professional sphere, as happened with basketball and volleyball (both now being relegated to field sports and amateur student ). In fact, the sport's federation has reported literally a virtual duopoly sports between football and tennis, campaigning to avoid the same fate they have faced almost every other professional sports in Chile.

Kits

Current roster

Pitchers

Pablo Ossandón
Alejandro Pérez
Antonio Vergara
Lois Solar
Juan Canque
Patricio Morales
Jonathan Castroo
Kentaro Abguillerm
Juan Orostegui
José Flores
Enzo Doria
Daniel Torres

Catchers

Fernando Romero
Sebastián Barrera
Diego Valenzuela

Infielders

James Sommerville
Ian Sommerville
Cristián Luna
Carlos Beroiza
Arturo Bugueño

Outfielders

Álvaro Campillay
Daniel Catalan
Thomas Salas
Franco Navarro

References

External links
Federación de Béisbol y Softbol de Chile

National baseball teams
baseball